Elazar ben Tsedaka ben Yitzhaq (Samaritan Hebrew:  ʾElā̊ʿzår ban Ṣīdqåʿ ban Yēṣʿā̊q; ; January 16, 1927 – February 3, 2010) was the Samaritan High Priest from 2004 until his death. He was born in Nablus. He succeeded his cousin Saloum Cohen in 2004. According to tradition he is the 131st holder of this post since Aaron.

During his time in office, he would lead the Samaritan community in their annual Passover ritual sacrifice of sheep.

Before retirement he worked as a mathematics teacher. His funeral in February 2010 was attended by Israeli and Palestinian officials, who noted his major efforts in helping to guide his community, and to serve as a bridge between Israeli and Palestinian communities.

References

External links
Photo
From Moses to Modernity: Passover with the Samaritans

1927 births
2010 deaths
Palestinian schoolteachers
People from Nablus
Samaritan high priests
Mathematics educators